Strejcekia is a genus of parasitoid wasps in the subfamily Pteromalinae.

References 

Pteromalidae
Hymenoptera genera